Chiakariga is a settlement in Tharaka Kenya's Eastern Province It was identified by a white settler who saw it a fit place for resting due to its cool and sunny climate at the foot of the natural Forest on the Kijege Hill where the place is located. Due to this identification by the white settler, a small trading center sprang up which has grown over time. Tarmac road that links the place to other towns including Nkubu and Nairobi has been connected recently. There is a proposal to connect the area to Meru National Park with tarmac road.

References 

Populated places in Eastern Province (Kenya)